Baha Edin Mohamed Abdallah Rihan (born 1 January 1979) is a Sudanese football goalkeeper who plays for Al Rabita Kosti and the Sudan national football team.

Houners

Club
Al-Merrikh SC
Sudan Premier League Champions (3)
2000,2001,2002
Sudan Cup Champions (4)
2001,2005,2006,2007
Al-Hilal Club
Sudan Premier League Champions (1)
2012

National Team
Sudan national football team
CECAFA Cup Champions (1)
2006
African Nations Championship 3rd (1)
2011 African Nations Championship

External links

1979 births
Living people
Association football goalkeepers
Sudanese footballers
Sudan international footballers
2008 Africa Cup of Nations players
2012 Africa Cup of Nations players
Al-Hilal Club (Omdurman) players
Sudan A' international footballers
2011 African Nations Championship players